Come Dine with Me Australia is an Australian reality television series based on the format of the UK show, Come Dine with Me. The show premiered on 18 January 2010 on The Lifestyle Channel. The show is narrated by Aimee Reid and James Valentine.

Format 
Each five-episode block of Come Dine with Me Australia follows a new set of five participants, with each episode featuring one of these contestants hosting the other four for dinner. After each dinner, the four guests rate their experience. Each contestants’ points are added after the five-episode block and the overall winner wins a $2000 cash prize.

The structure of the show is consistent across all four seasons. Each episode begins with the introduction of the contestant who is hosting for that episode. Then, the narrator talks through what food the host will be serving. As each course is described, a new participant is shown reading the menu the host has provided. During these breaks where new participants are shown, a small introduction is given for every individual. Once all courses of the meal have been described and all participants have been introduced, the dinner party begins. This either involves introductory interactions between the participants, or an activity provided by the host. After this concludes, the guests begin eating. At this point the show switches between the host cooking and the guests eating/talking. After the entrees are served, the guests begin looking around the hosts' house. This acts as a comedic break from the cooking, as the narrator comments on what is found, and how the guests act. The meal continues from then on, with different episodes taking different forms ranging from activities to games to drama. Once the meal and subsequent activities finish, the guests leave. Each guest is then shown in the back of a car. The guests individually discuss their thoughts about the night and rate their experience out of ten. The episode then ends with the narrator explaining the standings of the participants.

Production 
In 2009, The Lifestyle Channel bought the rights to the show, commissioning Granada Australia to produce a version for the Australian market. The first season consists of 20 episodes. A second season was approved before the first season premiered and was broadcast in mid-2010.

Episodes

Season 1 (2010)

Season 2 (2010)

Season 3 (2011)

Season 4 (2013)

Celebrity Come Dine With Me Australia

A celebrity version of the show was first aired on 11 December 2012 on the Lifestyle Channel. The first episode of Celebrity Come Dine with Me Australia was initially released as a Christmas special in between the release of the third and fourth seasons of Come Dine with Me Australia in December 2012. Another episode of the Celebrity version of the show was released a year later in December 2013 after the conclusion of the fourth and final season of the original show. Then, during January 2014, four episodes of Celebrity Come Dine with Me Australia were broadcast on The Lifestyle Channel.

International broadcasts
In July 2010, the show began broadcasting in the UK under the title Come Dine with Me Down Under before reverting to its original Come Dine with Me Australia title and changing again in the third series.

References

External links
Official website

See also
 MasterChef
 My Kitchen Rules

2010s Australian reality television series
Australian cooking television series
Australian television series based on British television series
Cooking competitions in Australia
Come Dine With Me
2010 Australian television series debuts
2013 Australian television series endings
English-language television shows
Television series by ITV Studios